Kooyong railway station is located on the Glen Waverley line in Victoria, Australia. It serves the eastern Melbourne suburb of Kooyong, and it opened on 24 March 1890.

History

Kooyong station opened on 24 March 1890, when the railway line from Burnley was extended to East Malvern. The station was originally named North Malvern, but was renamed soon after opening, amid fears regarding the name's similarity to North Melbourne. Like the suburb itself, the station was named after an Indigenous word meaning either 'camp', 'resting place' or 'haunt of the wild fowl'.

In 1955, the line between Kooyong and Gardiner was duplicated, with duplication to Heyington occurring in 1957.

A signal box is located at the Up end of Platform 2, to control the Glenferrie Road tramway crossing. In 1985, boom barriers replaced interlocked gates at this crossing.

Platforms and services

Kooyong has two side platforms. It is serviced by Metro Trains' Glen Waverley line services.

Platform 1:
  all stations and limited express services to Flinders Street

Platform 2:
  all stations services to Glen Waverley

Transport links

Yarra Trams operates one route via Kooyong station:
 : Melbourne University – Kew

Gallery

References

External links
 Melway map at street-directory.com.au

Railway stations in Australia opened in 1890
Railway stations in Melbourne
Railway stations in the City of Stonnington